Eucharis (minor planet designation: 181 Eucharis) is a large, slowly rotating main-belt asteroid that was discovered by French astronomer Pablo Cottenot on February 2, 1878, from Marseille Observatory. It was his only asteroid discovery. This object was named after Eucharis, a Greek nymph.

In the Tholen classification system, it is categorized as a stony S-type asteroid, while the Bus asteroid taxonomy system lists it as an Xk asteroid. Photometric observations of this asteroid at the Goat Mountain Astronomical Research Station in Rancho Cucamonga, California during 2007 gave a light curve with a leisurely rotation period of 52.23 ± 0.05 hours.

This object is the namesake of a family of 149–778 asteroids that share similar spectral properties and orbital elements; hence they may have arisen from the same collisional event. All members have a relatively high orbital inclination.

References

External links
 
 

Background asteroids
Eucharis
Eucharis
S-type asteroids (Tholen)
Xk-type asteroids (SMASS)
18780202